M3A1 may refer to:

M3A1 Bradley, a variant of an American armored reconnaissance vehicle
Stuart tank, an American light tank
M3 Half-track, an American armored vehicle
M3 submachine gun, an American submachine gun
M3 Scout Car, an American armored car